Zorge is a village and a former municipality in the district of Göttingen, in Lower Saxony, Germany. Since 1 November 2016 it has been part of the municipality of Walkenried. The river Zorge rises in the village.

Sights 
There is a good view of Zorge from the Pferdchen viewpoint, which is about 430 metres above sea level and is checkpoint 58 in the Harzer Wandernadel hiking network.

References

Former municipalities in Lower Saxony
Villages in the Harz